Wampas may refer to:

 Wampa, a fictional animal
 Les Wampas, a French punk rock/psychobilly band
 WAMPAS Baby Stars, a list of movie stars

See also
 Wampus (disambiguation)